A slasher is an implement with a long sharp blade used to clear scrub. Its long handle, and the open face of its blade, lends it to use for clearing thin and dense low-lying bush or scrub where an axe would be too clumsy. It is similar to a billhook, but with a longer handle.

Cutting tools